In the men's high jump event at the 2008 IAAF World Indoor Championships, Stefan Holm won the gold medal with a jump of 2.36m.

Medalists

Qualification

Qualification rule: qualification standard 2.30m or at least best 8 qualified

Final

High jump at the World Athletics Indoor Championships
High Jump Men